Verónica Rodríguez (born 26 March 1987) is a Mexican sports journalist and television host. She is best known for her tenure with Fox Sports Mexico and Fox Deportes, where she anchored programs such as Agenda Fox Sports and Lo Mejor de Fox Sports from 2014 to 2021.

Early life and education 
Verónica Rodríguez was born on 26 March 1987 in Mexico City. As a child, she became deeply fascinated with sports and the emotions it evokes. She studied communications at Universidad Iberoamericana and graduated with honors in 2010.

Career 
Rodríguez began her career as a reporter on Pumas TV in 2007. On the show, she covered the daily life of her favorite football club, UNAM Pumas. She hosted the show while she was in university, and was invited to join by a classmate, who was a producer for the show. After graduating from university, she worked for MVS Televisión, where she co-hosted the program Locas por el Fútbol. She has also contributed to the sports website Medio Tiempo.

Rodríguez was signed to Fox Sports Latin America in 2014 after several years of auditioning. She began hosting the sports entertainment program Fox Para Todos and La Previa del fin de Semana, which were previews of upcoming Pachuca and León matches and were aired before each game. She also became a sideline reporter for Liga MX and Liga MX Feminil matches.

In 2016, Rodríguez covered the Summer Olympics held in Rio de Janeiro, Brazil, as well as the UEFA Champions League Final held in Milan, Italy. In 2017, she began hosting the sports entertainment program Lo Mejor de Fox Sports, and the wrestling news program WWE Saturday Night alongside Jimena Sánchez. Through WWE Saturday Night, she covered several editions of Wrestlemania, Summerslam, Monday Night Raw, and live events across Mexico.

In 2018, Rodríguez began anchoring Agenda Fox Sports, a morning sports news program that airs in Latin America on Fox Sports and in the United States on Fox Deportes. She has also served as a reporter for Formula 1 and Formula E races. In 2019, she covered the UEFA Champions League Final held in Madrid, Spain.

In January 2020, Rodríguez announced that she would be taking a short break from Fox Sports because she was moving from Mexico to the United States. Because of the COVID-19 pandemic, she was able to continue hosting her usual programs for a while at home. However, due to personal issues, she had to continue her break. During her absence, she contributed to other sports websites, podcasts, and shows. She returned to Fox Sports on 3 May 2021, during an episode of Agenda Fox Sports. In addition to hosting programs and covering events for Fox Sports Mexico, Rodríguez was a Spanish broadcaster and ambassador for the English football club Wolverhampton Wanderers F.C. Rodríguez was laid off from Fox Sports Mexico and Fox Deportes in November 2021.

Other ventures 
Rodríguez identifies as a feminist. In 2017, she helped launch Versus, a non-profit, non-government organization, co-founded by her colleague Marion Reimers, devoted to combating gender, racial, and class discrimination in sports journalism. Rodríguez was featured in the organization's video launch alongside Reimers and Jimena Sánchez, as they show how they are met with a string of harmful and sexist messages on their social media accounts, because of their role as women in sports.

Rodríguez has been featured in numerous publications — including EstiloDF, NYLON Español, and Quien. In June 2019, she was featured in that month's issue of Maxim Mexico.

Personal life 
Rodríguez is an avid supporter of the Mexican football club UNAM Pumas, and has credited the club for sparking her love for sports. She is also a supporter of the Italian football club Juventus. Her hobbies include spending time at the beach, surfing, art, and photography.

On 19 August 2019, Rodríguez married Irish professional wrestler Fergal Devitt, better known as Finn Bálor, in a private ceremony in Tulum. They had confirmed their relationship in June that year, during an interview at the UEFA Champions League final, and Devitt proposed to Rodríguez the following day. They reside in Orlando, Florida.

Coverage 
Rodríguez has covered the following events and leagues for Fox Sports Mexico:

 Liga MX
Liga MX Feminil
Olympic Games (2016)
 Formula One (Mexican Grand Prix)
WWE WrestleMania (32, 33, 34, 35)
UEFA Champions League (2016, 2019)
 WWE SummerSlam (2016, 2017, 2018, 2019)

References

External links 
 
 

1987 births
Living people
Mexican expatriates in the United States
Mexican female models
Mexican journalists
Mexican people of Spanish descent
Mexican sports journalists
Mexican television journalists
Mexican television personalities
Mexican television presenters
Mexican women journalists
Mexican women television presenters
People from Mexico City
Universidad Iberoamericana alumni